Croatia competed at the 2020 Summer Paralympics in Tokyo, Japan, from 24 August to 5 September 2021.

Medalists

Competitors
The following is the list of number of competitors participating in the Games:

Athletics 

Three Croatian athletes (Ivan Katanušić, Miljenko Vučić, Matija Sloup and Mikela Ristoski) successfully qualified for the 2020 Paralympics after breaking the qualification limit. Zoran Talić, Deni Černi, Velimir Šandor, Marijan Presečan, Ana Gradečak and Vladimir Gašpar will also compete.

Field events

Boccia 

Davor Komar get a ticker for Croatia in Individual BC4 events.

Judo 

Lucija Brešković received invitation from IBSA.

Paratriathlon 

Antonio Franko qualified for PTS4 event as one of the top nine ranked athletes on the ITU Paralympic Qualification Ranking List.

Shooting

Swimming 

Three Croatian swimmer has successfully entered the paralympic slot after breaking the MQS (Dino Sinovčić, Kristijan Vincetić, Tomi Brajša). In July 2021, Paula Novina received invitation from World Para Swimming for 100m breaststroke SB8 event.

Table tennis

Croatia entered three athletes into the table tennis competition at the games. Anđela Mužinić qualified via World Ranking allocation. In May 2021, after withdrawal of current European champion in M7, the Regional Slot has been reallocated to Pavao Jozić. In June 2021, Helena Dretar Karić received invitation from International Table Tennis Federation.

Men

Women

Taekwondo

Para taekwondo makes its debut appearance in the Paralympic programme, Ivan Mikulić qualified to compete at the 2020 Summer Paralympics via World Ranking.

See also
Croatia at the Paralympics
Croatia at the 2020 Summer Olympics

References 

Nations at the 2020 Summer Paralympics
2020
2021 in Croatian sport